The 2016 Olympic Gymnastics Test Event, known officially as Aquece Rio 2016, served as the final qualifier to the gymnastics events at the 2016 Summer Olympics, in Rio de Janeiro, Brazil.

Concerns and criticisms
During the test event the FIG (International Gymnastics Federation) raised "serious concerns" regarding the state of preparations for the Summer Olympics. There were power outages while the athletes were performing. Furthermore, the concerns include problems with the timing system and insufficient lighting in competition and training halls.

Artistic gymnastics

Competition schedule

Medal summary

Medalists

Medal table

Results

Men's results

Team competition

Individual all-around

Apparatus finals qualifiers

Floor

Pommel horse

Rings

Vault

Parallel bars

Horizontal bar

Men's qualification

Floor

Pommel horse

Rings

Vault

Parallel bars

Horizontal bar

Women's results

Team competition

Individual all-around

Apparatus finals qualifiers

Vault

Uneven bars

Balance beam

Floor

Women's qualification

Vault

Uneven bars

Balance beam

Floor

Participants

Men
Teams
Teams placed 9-16 at the 2015 World Artistic Gymnastics Championships. 

Individuals
3 gymnasts
: Christos Lympanovnos, Vlasios Maras, Eleftherios Petrounias

2 gymnasts
: Dzmitry Barkalau, Andrey Likhovitskiy
: Sérgio Sasaki, Arthur Zanetti
: Liao Junlin, Sun Wei
: Jossimar Calvo, Javier Sandoval
: Brinn Bevan, Nile Wilson
: Vid Hidvégi, Botond Kardos
: Ludovico Edalli, Matteo Morandi
: Kim Han-sol, Yoo Won-chul
: Kevin Cerda Gastelum, Daniel Corral
: Andrés Pérez Ginés, Luis Rivera
: Kevin Rossi, Taha Serhani
: Chen Chih-yu, Lee Chih-kai
: Jacob Dalton, John Orozco

1 gymnast
: Mohamed Bourguieg
: Nicolás Córdoba
: Artur Davtyan
: Michael Mercieca
: Petro Pakhnyuk
: Tomás González
: Tarik Soto
: Filip Ude
: Randy Leru
: Marios Georgiou
: David Jessen
: Oskar Kirmes
: Shek Wai Hung
: Kieran Behan
: Alexander Shatilov
: Caleb Faulk
: Chihiro Yoshioka
: Robert Tvorogal
: Stian Skjerahaug
: Mikhail Koudinov
: Gustavo Palma Simões
: Ryan Patterson
: Ferhat Arican
: Anton Fokin
: Phạm Phước Hưng

Women
Teams

Individuals
2 gymnasts
: Elisa Hämmerle, Lisa Ecker
: Isabela Onyshko, Victoria-Kayen Woo
: Zhang Jin, Gong Kangyi
: Ana Pérez, Claudia Colom
: Gabrielle Jupp, Becky Downie
: Argyro Afrati, Vasiliki Millousi
: Zsófia Kovács, Noémi Makra
: Lara Mori, Giorgia Campana
: Ana Estefanía Lago, Alexa Moreno
: Lieke Wevers, Sanne Wevers
: Katarzyna Jurkowska-Kowalska, Gabriela Janik
: Emma Larsson, Jonna Adlerteg

1 gymnast
: Farah Boufadene
: Ailen Valente
: Houry Gebeshian
: Marina Nekrasova
: Kylie Dickson
: Simona Castro
: Catalina Escobar
: Ana Đerek
: Marcia Vidiaux
: Ana Sofía Gómez
: Dipa Karmakar
: Ellis O'Reilly
: Irina Sazonova
: Toni-Ann Williams
: Farah Ann Abdul Hadi
: Courtney McGregor
: Ariana Orrego
: Ana Filipa Martins
: Cătălina Ponor
: Teja Belak
: Barbora Mokošová
: Thema Williams
: Tutya Yilmaz
: Angelina Kysla
: Oksana Chusovitina
: Jessica López
: Phan Thị Hà Thanh

Rhythmic gymnastics

Competition schedule

Medal summary

Medalists

Medal table

Results

Individual all-around

Qualification

Final

Group competition

Trampoline

Competition schedule

Medal summary

Medalists

Medal table

Results

Men's trampoline

Qualification

Finals

Women's trampoline

Qualification

Finals

References

External links
Official website

2016 in gymnastics
Gymnastics at the 2016 Summer Olympics
Qualification for the 2016 Summer Olympics
2016 in Brazilian sport
Gymnastics